Amaurobius latebrosus is a species of spider in the family Amaurobiidae, found in Corsica.

References

latebrosus
Spiders of Europe
Spiders described in 1874